Henry John Mello (March 27, 1924 – September 4, 2004) was an American politician from California. Mello was a member of the California Senate known for the Community Facilities District Act, otherwise known as the Mello-Roos Act.

Early life 
On March 27, 1924, Mello was born in Watsonville, California. Mello's father was a Portuguese immigrant. Mello attended Watsonville High School.

Education 
Mello attended Hartnell College in Salinas, California.

Career 
In 1940, Mello and his father started a farming business. In 1948, Mello founded Mello Packing Company.

In 1966, Mello was elected to the Board of Supervisor for Santa Cruz County, California.

In 1976, Mello won the election and became a member of the California State Assembly for District 28. In 1980, Mello won the election and became a member of California State Senate for District 17.

Personal life 
Mello's wife was Helen Mello (d.2014). They had four sons, Stephen, John, Michael and Timothy Mello.

On September 4, 2004, Mello died in Watsonville, California. He was 80 years old.

Legacy 
 Senator Henry J. Mello Highway.
 1990 Henry J. Mello Foundation.
 Henry J. Mello Center, a concert performance hall in Watsonville, California.

See also 
 Mello-Roos (with Mike Roos)

References

External links 
 In Honor of Henry Mello at votesmart.org
 Mello, Henry J. at ourcampaigns.com
 Join California Henry Mello

Democratic Party California state senators
1924 births
2004 deaths
20th-century American politicians
Democratic Party members of the California State Assembly